Pathum Thani United Football Club (Thai สโมสรฟุตบอลจังหวัดปทุมธานี) is a Thai professional football club based in Thanyaburi, Pathum Thani province. They currently play in 2018 Thailand Amateur League Eastern Region.

Timeline
History of events of Pathum Thani United Football Club

Stadium and locations

Season By Season record

References

External links
 Official Website of Pathum Thani F.C

Association football clubs established in 2010
Football clubs in Thailand
Pathum Thani province
2010 establishments in Thailand